Don Barton (May 29, 1930 – July 16, 2006) was a former halfback in the National Football League.

Biography
He was born Don Reid Barton in Cisco, Texas.

Career
Don played with the Green Bay Packers during the 1953 NFL season and wore number 43. He played at the collegiate level at the University of Texas at Austin.

See also
List of Green Bay Packers players

References

1930 births
2006 deaths
People from Cisco, Texas
Green Bay Packers players
American football halfbacks
Texas Longhorns football players